R&H Hall plc is Ireland's biggest importer and supplier of animal feed ingredients for feed manufacturing through its trading, purchasing, shipping and storage capability.

Company history
IAWS purchased two small feed trading businesses between 1988 and 1989 called Unigrain and James Allen. Another feed trading company, R&H Hall plc, was purchased by IAWS in September 1990 and at that time was a major acquisition doubling the size of the overall organisation. Founded in Cork in 1839 and quoted on the stock exchange since 1967, R&H Hall had a record of service to Irish agribusiness. All three companies were merged under the name R&H Hall, as this was the best known of the names.

Company location and operation

The group's trade and shipping capability gives it access to international markets and sources of supply. Ingredients are imported from twenty countries worldwide via its deep-water port facilities around the Irish coast; Belfast, Dublin, Cork, Ringaskiddy and Foynes.

R&H Hall also provides a specialised bulk cereal handling, drying, screening and storage service as well as an export capability.

See also
 Goulding Chemicals

External links
 R&H Hall Group plc

Food and drink companies of Ireland
Companies of the Republic of Ireland